Laizhou railway station is a railway station in Yanping District, Nanping, Fujian, China. It is currently used exclusively by freight trains, but previously it handled passengers.

Name
On 13 December 2004, the name of the station was changed from Laizhou to Nanping North. However, on 1 July 2006, the name was reverted to Laizhou reportedly due to passenger confusion.

History
The station was built with the Yingtan–Xiamen railway and opened in 1956.

In the 1970s, the station was upgraded and expanded. A turning wye was replaced with a turntable.

Laizhou was regularly used as a reversal point for services arriving from the east on the Nanping–Fuzhou railway and continuing south on the Yingtan–Xiamen railway, or vice-versa.

Passenger services were withdrawn in January 2016 however the station still contains a large yard for freight trains.

References 

Railway stations in Fujian
Railway stations in China opened in 1956